NN Serpentis (abbreviated NN Ser) is an eclipsing post-common envelope binary system approximately 1670 light-years away. The system comprises an eclipsing white dwarf and red dwarf. The two stars orbit each other every 0.13 days.

Planetary system

A planetary system has been inferred to exist around NN Ser by several teams. All of these teams rely on the fact that Earth sits in the same plane as the NN Serpentis binary star system, so humans can see the larger red dwarf eclipse the white dwarf every 0.13 days. Astronomers are then able to use these frequent eclipses to spot a pattern of small but significant irregularities in the orbit of stars, which could be attributed to the presence and gravitational influence of circumbinary planets.

Chen (2009) used these "eclipse timing variations" to suggesting a putative orbital period spanning between 30 and 285 years and a minimum mass between 0.0043 and 0.18 Solar masses.

In late 2009, Qian estimated a minimum mass of 10.7 Jupiter masses and orbital period of 7.56 years for this planet, probably located at 3.29 Astronomical Units. This has since been disproven by further measurements of the eclipse times of the binary stars.

In late 2009 and 2010, researchers from the UK (University of Warwick and the University of Sheffield), Germany (Georg-August-Universitat in Göttingen, Eberhard-Karls-Universitat in Tübingen), Chile (Universidad de Valparaíso), and the United States (University of Texas at Austin) suggested that the eclipse timing variations are caused by two gas giant planets. The more massive gas giant is about 6 times the mass of Jupiter and orbits the binary star every 15.5 years, the other orbits every 7.75 years and is about 1.6 times the mass of Jupiter.

All published planetary models have failed to predict changes in eclipse timing since 2018, suggesting that a different explanation for the eclipse timing variations may be needed.

See also
 Algol
 HW Virginis
 CM Draconis
 Kepler-16
 Kepler-47, another binary system with 3 planets

References

External links
 The Extrasolar Planet Encyclopaedia — Catalog Listing
  UK Astronomers Help Find Snooker Star System

Eclipsing binaries
Serpentis, NN
White dwarfs
M-type main-sequence stars
2
Hypothetical planetary systems
Serpens (constellation)